The Western International Hockey League (WIHL) was a senior level ice hockey league that featured teams from the Western United States and Western Canada. It operated from 1946–62 and 1963–88. It grew out of the West Kootenay League, which operated in southeast British Columbia from the 1920s.

The league had teams in the British Columbian cities of Trail, Nelson, Kimberley, Rossland, Fernie, and Cranbrook; in Spokane, Washington; Calgary, Alberta; Portland, Oregon; and Los Angeles. The league did not operate in 1962–63 while member team the Trail Smoke Eaters competed for and won the world amateur championship overseas.

At various times in the 1950s and 1960s the league had an interlocking schedule with the Okanagan Senior League and the Alberta Senior Hockey League. It also played matches against the Pacific Hockey League in 1978–79.

In an era when there were fewer NHL and minor professional teams and leagues in North America, winning the Allan Cup was a difficult challenge and the national championship trophy was a coveted prize.  The WIHL, along with other highly competitive senior leagues across Canada (with member teams located in the USA as well), was considered among the best amateur hockey in North America. Even until the 1980s, the caliber of play was excellent and many former top CHL, junior A, university and pro level players went on to compete for WIHL teams.  The WIHL champions would be considered one of the top non-professional teams in North America each year.

The champions of the WIHL received the Shore-Montgomery Trophy, donated by movie stars Dinah Shore and George Montgomery in 1946. It is now on display in the Trail Sports Hall of Memories.

WIHL teams that went on to win the Allan Cup:

1961–1962 – Trail Smoke Eaters  (also won in 1937–1938 and the Trail Smoke Eaters won the World Championship in 1939, 1961)

1969–1970 – Spokane Jets

1971–1972 – Spokane Jets

1975–1976 – Spokane Flyers

1977–1978 – Kimberley Dynamiters (also won in 1935–1936 and the Kimberley Dynamiters won the World Championship in 1937)

1979–1980 – Spokane Flyers

1981–1982 – Cranbrook Royals

Teams
Calgary Stampeders (1978–79)
Cranbrook Royals (1965–88)
Elk Valley Blazers (1979–88)
Kimberley Dynamiters 
Los Angeles Ramblers (1946–47)
Nelson Maple Leafs (1946–62, 1963–87)
Portland Buckaroos (1974–75)
Rossland Warriors
Spokane Spartans (1946–48)
Spokane Flyers (1948–58,1974–78,1979–80)
Spokane Jets (1963–74)
Spokane Chiefs (1982–1985)
Trail Smoke Eaters (1946–62, 1963–84, 1985–87)

Regular season champions
1946–47 Kimberley Dynamiters 
1947–48 Trail Smoke Eaters 
1948–49 Spokane Flyers (league title)
1949–50 Spokane Flyers (league title) 
1950–51 Trail Smoke Eaters 
1951–52 Trail Smoke Eaters 
1952–53 Spokane Flyers 
1953–54 Nelson Maple Leafs 
1954–55 Kimberley Dynamiters 
1955–56 Spokane Flyers 
1956–57 Spokane Flyers 
1957–58 Rossland Warriors 
1958–59 Nelson Maple Leafs 
1959–60 Trail Smoke Eaters 
1960–61 Nelson Maple Leafs 
1961–62 Trail Smoke Eaters (won 1962 Allan Cup)
1963–64 Kimberley Dynamiters 
1964–65 Nelson Maple Leafs 
1965–66 Kimberley Dynamiters 
1966–67 Nelson Maple Leafs 
1967–68 Spokane Jets 
1968–69 Spokane Jets 
1969–70 Spokane Jets (won 1970 Allan Cup)
1970–71 Nelson Maple Leafs 
1971–72 Spokane Jets (won 1972 Allan Cup)
1972–73 Spokane Jets 
1973–74 Cranbrook Royals 
1974–75 Spokane Flyers
1975–76 Spokane Flyers (won 1976 Allan Cup)
1976–77 Spokane Flyers 
1977–78 Kimberley Dynamiters (won 1978 Allan Cup)
1978–79 Trail Smoke Eaters 
1979–80 Spokane Flyers (won 1980 Allan Cup)
1980–81 Kimberley Dynamiters 
1981–82 Cranbrook Royals (won 1982 Allan Cup)
1982–83 Trail Smoke Eaters 
1983–84 Spokane Chiefs 
1984–85 Spokane Chiefs 
1985–86 Nelson Maple Leafs 
1986–87 Nelson Maple Leafs 
1987–88 Elk Valley Blazers

Note: In 1948–49 and 1949–50 the Trail Smoke Eaters advanced to the British Columbia playoffs because Spokane was not eligible for the Allan Cup.

See also
List of WIHL seasons

References 

 
Defunct ice hockey leagues in the United States
Defunct ice hockey leagues in Canada